is a Japanese manga series by Yuka Fujiwara. Crash! was serialized in the monthly  manga magazine Ribon from the May 2007 issue to the December 2009 issue. A second part was serialized from the April 2010 issue to August 2013 issue in Ribon under the subtitle Brand New Happy Wave. During the series' run, two vomics (voice comics) were released, and an anime adaptation was featured on the children's variety show Oha Suta.

Plot

Act 1

Hana Shiraboshi, a high school student whose mother is the CEO of the White Star Talent Agency, is assigned to produce an idol group for the agency's 10th anniversary. Hana's nosebleed occurs whenever her she sees potential in others, and she uses it to scout five boys: Kiri Kurose, Rei Shinozuka, Junpei Akamatsu, Kazuhiko Midorikawa, and Yugo Aoyagi. Together, the five debut as the boy band Crash, with Hana as their manager. To reach their goal of becoming the top idol group, with the help of Hana, Crash gains experience through singing, acting, and dancing.

Act 2: Brand New Happy Wave

Two years later, Crash has become a successful group. Yui Sakura, Kazuhiko's childhood friend, becomes Hana's assistant in managing the group at White Star on his recommendation. As Yui helps Crash with their entertainment activities, she falls in love with Rei. Meanwhile, Kazuhiko reveals to Yui that he has been in love with her since childhood.

Characters

Protagonists

Hana is a business-oriented high school student whose family runs the White Star Talent Agency. Whenever she sees potential in her talents, she gets a nosebleed.

Yui is the protagonist of the Act 2. She is a clumsy but good-hearted high school student and used to attend the same dance as Kazuhiko. On his recommendation, she begins working as Hana's assistant. She falls in love with Rei but also starts finding herself attracted to Kazuhiko when he confesses to her.

Crash

Kiri is a student from Hana's high school. He is brash and arrogant, but he is also charismatic and plays the guitar. He decides to join White Star to pay off his father's debt. Throughout the series, he falls in love with Hana, but she remains oblivious.

Rei is a quiet first-year high school student whose father is a world-famous magician. He is level-headed, observant, and calm, which causes him to clash with Kiri. Throughout the series, he falls in love with Hana, but she remains oblivious.

Junpei is the leader of Crash and specializes in street dance. He acts as an older brother figure to everyone and later dates Marika, another idol from their agency.

Kazuhiko is the youngest of the group and a middle school student at the start of the story. He is a longtime friend of Junpei's and comes from a family specializing in traditional Japanese dance. He is in love with Yui.

Yugo is a third-year in high school and the oldest in Crash. He is flirtatious around women.

Media

Manga

Crash! is written and illustrated by Yuka Fujiwara. It was serialized in the monthly magazine Ribon from the May 2007 issue to the December 2009 issue. Fujiwara created the series due to the growing popularity of idols in media, and she had based all members of Crash on characters from her previous works.

As the original story arc of Crash! was concluding, Fujiwara was asked to continue the story with a new main character as the focus. After consideration, Fujiwara published a second act in Ribon from the April 2010 issue to August 2013 released on July 3, 2013. The second act, published as Act 2: Brand New Happy Wave in the bound volumes beginning with volume 8, introduced Yui Sakura as the new main character. The chapters were later released in 16 bound volumes by Shueisha under the Ribon Mascot Comics imprint.

During the series' run, a vomic (voice comic) was released on Shueisha's website in 2009, which adapted the first chapter. A media mix project was announced on October 2, 2010 through the November 2010 issue of Ribon, consisting of a second vomic billed as a special version and a song produced exclusively for the series. The special edition vomic released in 2011 with a new voice cast and original story. It was also later released as a magazine gift on DVD with the June 2012 issue of Ribon on May 1, 2012. The song was announced on November 2, 2010 through the December 2010 issue. Titled "Crash on You", the song was produced by Elements Garden with lyrics by Fujiwara, featuring the new voice cast. The lyrics to the full version of the song were available as an online preorder bonus of volume 10 of the manga.

Light novels

A light novel adaptation of the first part was written by Aki Hirose and published by Shueisha under the Shueisha Mirai Bunko imprint, with illustrations provided by Fujiwara.

Anime

In 2012, an anime adaptation aired as short animated segments on the children's variety show Oha Suta, which was broadcast on TV Tokyo.

Reception

Volume 8 debuted at #28 on Oricon and sold 19,950 copies in its first week. Volume 9 debuted at #30 on Oricon and sold 23,415 copies in its first week. Volume 15 debuted at #46 on Oricon and sold 23,246 copies in its first week. Volume 16 debuted at #44 on Oricon and sold 14,693 copies in its first week.

References

External links

Japanese idols in anime and manga
Shueisha manga
Shōjo manga